Murcheh Khort (also Romanized as Mūrcheh Khort and Mūrcheh Khovrt; also known as Morcha-Khūrt, Morcheh Khort, Mūrcheh Khort, Mūrcheh Khūr, and Mūrcheh Khūrd) is a village in Murcheh Khvort Rural District, in the Central District of Shahin Shahr and Meymeh County, Isfahan Province, Iran. At the 2006 census, its population was 1,523, in 431 families.

The Battle of Murche-Khort took place here, and was a part of Nader Shah's campaign to restore the Safavid dynasty

References 

 morch khort site

 morch khort site

Populated places in Shahin Shahr and Meymeh County